A hydrant coupler is a type of aircraft fueling equipment which opens and allows fuel to flow through the hydrant cart into the aircraft. A hydrant coupler needs 60lbs of air pressure to open up the pit valve to allow the flow of fuel. Hydrant couplers run off a pressure fueling system consisting of fuel and air pressure.

See also
Aircraft fuel system

References

External links
meggittfuelling.com
fluid-transfer.co.uk
groundsupportworldwide.com
beckerassociates.com

Fuels infrastructure